The 2002 Coca-Cola GM was the 32nd edition of the Greenlandic Men's Football Championship. The final round was held in Ilulissat, Greenland. It was won by Kugsak-45 for the second time in its history.

Qualifying stage

North Greenland

Disko Bay

Central Greenland

Pool A

Pool B

East Greenland

South Greenland

Playoff

Narsaq-85 qualified for the final Round.
Nagtoralik Paamiut withdrew.

Final round

Pool 1

Pool 2

Playoffs

Semi-finals

Seventh-place match

Fifth-place match

Third-place match

Final

See also
Football in Greenland
Football Association of Greenland
Greenland national football team
Greenlandic Men's Football Championship

References

Greenlandic Men's Football Championship seasons
Green
Green
football